Ahlatçık can refer to:

 Ahlatçık, Devrekani, village in Turkey
 Ahlatcık, İskilip
 Ahlatçık, Kastamonu, village in Turkey